Oak Park High School is a high school located in the Charleswood area of Winnipeg, Manitoba. It offers a dual-track English and French Immersion program. Oak Park also offers Advanced Placement (AP) courses and one of the most comprehensive fine arts programs in the province. The Oak Park Raiders have won 3 Manitoba High School Athletics Association titles over the past decade, the most in Winnipeg.

Athletics
Oak Park High School has one of the best athletic programs in the province. As a regular contender in many sports, Oak Park has made their mark on the sport community. Oak Park took eight provincial titles in 2010-2011 and was provincial finalists in Varsity Girls Basketball and Girls Outdoor Soccer. The school offers an extensive list of extracurriculars, including: basketball, darts, football, hockey, soccer (indoor and outdoor), volleyball, rugby, cheerleading, ultimate frisbee, water polo, track & field, badminton, student council, musical, dance, curling and field lacrosse. The Oak Park football team is notable for establishing 4 CFL football players.

Success has been harder to come by in recent seasons as the MHSAA tightened transfer and recruiting policies.

Notable alumni 
 Cam Barker - NHL defenceman
 Nic Demski - professional football player
 Cody Eakin  - NHL forward
 Andrew Harris - CFL running back
 Sean Jamieson - professional football player for the Montreal Alouettes
 David Nedohin - three-time world champion curler
 Brady Oliveira - professional football player
 Calvin Pickard - NHL goaltender
 Tracy Spiridakos - film and television actress
 Meaghan Waller - Winner of Canada's Next Top Model, Cycle 3

Committees 
Oak Park is known in both the local and national community alike as having class leading committees such as their volunteerism based social justice committee, the committee that runs all the school events Tech Committee, the sustainability based progressive conservation committee or their yearbook committee.

References

External links 
 Oak Park High School Homepage

High schools in Winnipeg
Educational institutions in Canada with year of establishment missing
Charleswood, Winnipeg